This is a list of notable events relating to the environment in 1979. They relate to environmental law, conservation, environmentalism and environmental issues.

Events
The Environmental Planning and Assessment Act 1979 was passed in the Australian state of New South Wales.
The gastric-brooding frog is presumed to be extinct.

March 
The Three Mile Island accident partial nuclear meltdown occurred at the Three Mile Island power plant in Dauphin County, Pennsylvania in the United States. It was the worst accident in U.S. commercial nuclear power plant history, and resulted in the release of small amounts of radioactive gases and radioactive iodine into the environment.

June 
The Ixtoc I oil spill occurred in the Gulf of Mexico. The well had suffered a blowout resulting in one of largest oil spills in history.

July 
The Church Rock Uranium Mill Spill occurred in the United States when a uranium mill tailings disposal pond breached its dam. Local residents used river water for irrigation and livestock and were not immediately aware of the toxic danger.

November 
 The MT Independenţa oil tanker collided with another ship and subsequently exploded. It burned for weeks, causing heavy air and sea pollution in the Istanbul area and the Sea of Marmara.

See also

Human impact on the environment
List of environmental issues